Arvo Sarapuu (August 26, 1953 – March 17, 2020) was an Estonian businessman, politician, and member of the Estonian Centre Party. Sarapuu served as the first post-independence County Governor of Järva County from 1989 until 1997. He then served as the Deputy Mayor of Tallinn, the capital of Estonia, from April 2011 until his resignation on May 26, 2017, due to allegations of corruption.

Arvo Sarapuu died on March 17, 2020, at the age of 66. He was survived by his wife, Kersti Sarapuu, who served as Mayor of Paide from 2005 to 2011, and their five children. Sarapuu was buried in Metsakalmistu cemetery in Tallinn.

Honors
Order of the National Coat of Arms, 3rd class (2006)

References

1953 births
2020 deaths
Estonian businesspeople
Politicians from Tallinn
Estonian Centre Party politicians
Tallinn University of Technology alumni
Politicians from Tartu
Burials at Metsakalmistu
20th-century Estonian politicians
Recipients of the Order of the National Coat of Arms, 3rd Class
Members of the Riigikogu, 2007–2011
Members of the Riigikogu, 2015–2019